Oleg Leonidovich Delov (born 25 May 1963) is a former Russian professional football coach and a former player. He made his professional debut in the Soviet Second League in 1981 for FC Avangard Kursk.

References

1963 births
Living people
Soviet footballers
Russian footballers
Association football midfielders
Russian Premier League players
Russian expatriate footballers
Expatriate footballers in Belarus
FC Torpedo Mogilev players
PFC Krylia Sovetov Samara players
FC Salyut Belgorod players
FC Dynamo Bryansk players
Russian football managers
FC Avangard Kursk players
FC Iskra Smolensk players